Alexander Newbigging (12 September 1876 – 1976) was a Scottish footballer who played in the Football League for Nottingham Forest, in the Southern Football League for Queens Park Rangers, Reading (two one-season spells) and Coventry City, and in the Scottish Football League for Abercorn and Rangers. Usually a goalkeeper, he is also recorded as having played outfield as a forward.

His elder brother Willie and younger brother Harry were also footballers. He lived to the age of 99, and in 1973 was one of the guests of honour for Rangers' centenary events at Ibrox Park.

Notes

References

1876 births
1976 deaths
Date of death missing
Scottish footballers
Association football goalkeepers
Footballers from South Lanarkshire
English Football League players
Scottish Football League players
Southern Football League players
Scottish Junior Football Association players
Scotland junior international footballers
Abercorn F.C. players
Lanark United F.C. players
Queens Park Rangers F.C. players
Nottingham Forest F.C. players
Reading F.C. players
Rangers F.C. players
Coventry City F.C. players
Inverness Thistle F.C. players